Lake Conache is located in the village of Conache, in Laredo District, near Trujillo in the Peruvian region La Libertad.

Description

This lake has an area of approximately 9 hectares, and is close to the Pampas de San Juan, jurisdiction of the town called Santo Domingo in Laredo district.
 
The lake is next to large dunes that are visited to practice Sandboarding (table sport on sand). In addition, near the lagoon Conache are extensive forests of carob presenting a variety of wildlife, and are visited by tourists; they are a complementary attraction of the lake, that It is visited for enjoy a swim, a boat ride a fish called tilapia.

Origin of the Lake
Formerly, the Lake Conache was seasonal and periodically it was formed during the rainy season in the area, and months after it dried, but after completing the second phase of the special project of irrigation Chavimochic, with the continuous flood irrigation of the crops in the Pampas de San Juan, the water table increased gradually by the leaks, and the lake came to have a permanent water and it was growing its volumen.

Fauna
The lake has a varied wildlife: egrets, chiscos, wild ducks, tilapia, freshwater fish and gallinetas, charcoca as can be observed in some months of the year flocks of birds migrate to this habitat for nesting.

Flora

Mainly It is observed the presence of cattails and reeds that grow rapidly in the lagoon. There are also abundant and carob trees that surround the lake.

See also
Trujillo
Laredo District
Conache

External links
Lake Conache (Wikimapia)

Media
  near Trujillo city (Peru).

References

Conache
Conache